St. Charles College was a minor seminary in Catonsville, Maryland, originally located in Ellicott City, Maryland.

History

Charles Carroll of Carrollton (1737–1832) was a signer of the Declaration of Independence for Maryland. One of the wealthiest men in the Americas at that time and a newly elected delegate to the Second Continental Congress and the only Roman Catholic to vote on independence and sign the document, Carroll staked his fortune on the American Revolution. After the Revolution, Carroll became president of the Maryland Senate in the General Assembly and divided his time between the family mansion and estate Doughoregan Manor in western Anne Arundel County (later Howard County), near Ellicott Mills on the upper Patapsco River, and Annapolis. One of his most important tasks he said was when he helped lay the "first stone" for the new technology of transportation, the Baltimore and Ohio Railroad on Independence Day, July 4, 1828, west of the city near modern Halethorpe. At his death in 1832, he was the last surviving signer of the Declaration of Independence and was laid to rest with other Carrolls in the crypt at the family chapel at Doughoregan.

In 1784 Charles bought Marys Lott, a  farm from Jacob Burgoon, a Catholic immigrant from Alsace-Lorraine, France, who came to America in about 1745 and settled in Elkridge, Maryland. Jacob and his wife Elizabeth were indentured servants, Jacob working as a cordwainer (shoemaker). They had bought Marys Lott in 1762. They had eight children, and after selling Marys Lott they moved to a farm in what is now Carroll County, Maryland. Marys Lott became part of the land later given for St. Charles College.

Ambrose Maréchal (1764–1828), the future third Archbishop of Baltimore, and other Sulpician priests were frequent guests at Doughoregan, saying Mass there often and gaining the ear of the Charles Carroll. During subsequent years a request of land was made for a minor seminary. Carroll, however, denied the request because he felt he could not break up or donate any part of his patrimony.

In 1830, Emily Caton MacTavish, favorite granddaughter of the Signer and sister of the "Three American Graces", convinced Carroll to give  to the Sulpician Fathers for the erection of a minor seminary — Saint Charles. She accomplished this by suggesting he donate land that he had bought during his lifetime. Included was Mary's Lott, aptly named for a gift to the Church, thought Carroll at the time. The college was incorporated on February 3, 1830, with the name "St. Charles" chosen for its benefactor, Charles Carroll.

Construction started on the college building in 1831.

The first building of Saint Charles College (minor seminary) was completed in 1848, and the college opened on October 31 with two faculty: the president, Father Oliver Jenkins; a deacon, Edward Caton; and four students.

Two wings were added in 1859 and blessed by Francis Patrick Kenrick, Archbishop of the Roman Catholic Archdiocese of Baltimore. "Our Lady of the Angels Chapel" was started at this time, but completion was delayed by the Civil War until 1866. It was lavishly decorated mainly through the generosity of its first rector and president, Father Oliver Jenkins.

Two additional wings were added to the building in 1878 for a 190-person enrollment.

In 1898 a vastly enlarged Saint Charles College celebrated its 50th anniversary. The park-like grounds of St. Charles looked southeast towards the Frederick Road, later the eastern end of the historic National Road, the first federally sponsored interstate route begun in the early 1800s from Baltimore to Cumberland and on to the western states finally ending near the Mississippi River in Vandalia, Illinois, then the territorial capital of the Territory of Illinois. In later years the college would overlook Wilkens Avenue, which also runs southwestward out of the city near the intersection of Maiden Choice Lane.

On March 16, 1911, disaster struck: the college was completely destroyed by a fire that began in the chapel cellar. None of the 200+ faculty and students were killed or injured. Sacred vessels and vestments, along with thousands of priceless manuscripts and books were lost. The burned-out shell was pulled down, and the salvageable building materials were transported to Catonsville, where the college was quickly rebuilt. All that remained were standing ruins of the 1906 Recreation Hall.

The area was purchased by Howard County Planning Board member William Phillip Brendel, who ran Brendel Manor Park opening in 1942. Brendel's Manor Park (also known as Gospel Park) hosted the first Howard County Fair onsite in 1946 and 1950, with prison labor used to build structures. In the early 1970s, it was the home of Robert G. Millar's Christian Identity community. It has since been upzoned and developed into a suburban housing community. The property was subdivided several times, with Robert J. Lanceolott and Synergy Development Corp. developing over the historic ruins of the first college buildings in 1991 to build the "Terra Maria Community". The ruins of the old minor seminary's recreation hall and laundry are now located in the middle of Terra Maria Way circle with the grotto removed for a storm water retention pond.()

In 1969, St. Charles' High School Department with boarding school was closed and the junior college merged with the upper college of St. Mary's Seminary and University now on Roland Avenue and Belvedere Avenue/Northern Parkway in the Roland Park neighborhood of north Baltimore (having moved there from North Paca Street by St. Mary's Street in the old Seton Hill neighborhood to new landmark buildings of Beaux Arts/Classical Revival style architecture on a new expansive park-like campus in 1929). The old St. Charles second campus was renamed "St. Mary's Seminary College" and continued its educational programs, now opened up to ecumenical participation.

In 1977 the college closed and the property was sold to Erickson Retirement Communities, Inc.; it is presently known as Charlestown Retirement Community.

St. Charles College Historic District

St. Charles College Historic District is a historic Roman Catholic church seminary and national historic district at Catonsville, Baltimore County, Maryland, United States. The main complex consists of six interconnected buildings, three of which form the central group: Chapel, Administration Building, and Old Dormitory. Each has a rusticated stone first floor and upper levels of buff brick with stone trim in the Italian Renaissance style.  The complex includes three additional buildings: the Dining Hall, connected by a passageway; the Convent, physically attached to the Dining Hall, and the Power House.

It was added to the National Register of Historic Places in 1983.

Notable alumni
    
Patrick Joseph Byrne, Maryknoll missionary who served as Apostolic Delegate to Korea
 John F. Collins (1872–1962), Mayor of Providence, Rhode Island 1939–1941
George Sterling, poet and playwright
Thomas Frederick Price, cofounder of Maryknoll
John Surratt, conspirator in the assassination plot of 16th President Abraham Lincoln in 1865
Louis J. Weichmann

Notes

References

External links

, including undated photo, at Maryland Historical Trust

Defunct Catholic universities and colleges in the United States
Defunct private universities and colleges in Maryland
Catholic seminaries in the United States
Historic districts on the National Register of Historic Places in Maryland
Properties of religious function on the National Register of Historic Places in Maryland
University and college buildings on the National Register of Historic Places in Maryland
Buildings and structures in Baltimore County, Maryland
Educational institutions established in 1848
Educational institutions disestablished in 1977
Catholic universities and colleges in Maryland
1848 establishments in Maryland
National Register of Historic Places in Baltimore County, Maryland
1977 disestablishments in Maryland